Top Country Albums is a chart that ranks the top-performing country music albums in the United States, published by Billboard.  In 1984, nine different albums topped the chart, based on sales reports submitted by a representative sample of stores nationwide.  The chart was published under the title Top Country LPs through the issue of Billboard dated October 13, and Top Country Albums thereafter.

In the issue of Billboard dated January 7, Kenny Rogers was at number one with his album Eyes That See in the Dark, its eleventh week in the top spot.  The album remained at number one through the issue dated February 11, after which it was displaced by Right or Wrong by George Strait, which spent five non-consecutive weeks atop the chart over a seven-month period.  It was the first number one for Strait, who would go on to set a record for the highest number of chart-toppers by an artist, reaching the peak position with 27 albums over the subsequent 35 years.  Having sold more than 100 million albums in his career, Strait is considered one of the biggest stars in country music.

In July, Hank Williams Jr reached number one for the first time in more than fifteen years with Major Moves; his only previous appearance at the top of the chart had been in 1969 with Songs My Father Left Me.  Nine of his ten albums which entered the chart between 1979 and 1983 had reached the top ten but fallen short of the peak position; Major Moves, however, would begin a run of eight consecutive chart-toppers for the singer.  Alabama's album Roll On spent the highest total number of weeks at number one in 1984, with thirteen weeks in the peak position in two separate spells.  It was the fourth consecutive album by the band to top the chart, but had the shortest time in the top spot of their four number ones to date; the previous three had all spent over 20 weeks at number one.   The longest unbroken run at number one in 1984 was achieved by Willie Nelson with City of New Orleans, which spent 12 consecutive weeks atop the chart.  It was displaced in the issue of Billboard dated December 22 by the year's final chart-topper, Kentucky Hearts, the first number-one country album for the band Exile.  The band had originally performed primarily pop music and had topped the Hot 100 in 1978 with the disco-influenced track "Kiss You All Over", but went on to achieve much greater success after a shift to the country genre in the early 1980s.

Chart history

References

1984
1984 record charts